The year 1562 in science and technology included a number of events, some of which are listed here.

Geography
 Diego Gutiérrez and Hieronymus Cock published the map Americae Sive Quartae Orbis Partis Nova Et Exactissima Descriptio.

Mathematics
 Humphrey Baker's arithmetic textbook The Wellspring of Sciences first published in London.

Births
 April 24 – Xu Guangqi, Chinese polymath (died 1633)
 October 4 – Christen Sørensen Longomontanus, Danish astronomer (died 1647)

Deaths
 October 9 – Gabriele Falloppio, Italian anatomist and physician (born 1523)

 
16th century in science
1560s in science